The Commission of National Education (KEN) was the central educational authority in the Polish–Lithuanian Commonwealth, created by the Sejm and King Stanisław II August  on October 14, 1773. Because of its vast authority and autonomy, it is considered the first Ministry of Education in European history and an important achievement of the Polish Enlightenment.

History

Genesis
The chief reason behind its creation was that in Poland and Lithuania, the Jesuits ran an extensive system of educational institutions. Although the Jesuit schools were fairly efficient and provided the Polish youth with a good education, they were also very conservative. In addition, in 1773 the Pope decided to close down the Jesuit order (Dominus ac Redemptor). This threatened a complete breakdown of education in the Commonwealth.

One of the first items on the parliamentary agenda of the Partition Sejm (1773–1775), which acceded to the First Partition of Poland, was the assessment in how to best utilise the former Jesuit property and declaration of a firm intention to the continuity of the education system.

The Commission was formally created on October 14, 1773. It was one of the newly set-up "Grand Commissions";  organisations with the status of a ministry, albeit with a collegiate structure. Its main mastermind and chief figure was a Catholic priest, Hugo Kołłątaj; other notable supporters included Ignacy Potocki and Adam K. Czartoryski. Initially, the governing body consisted of 4 senators and 4 members of the Sejm, half of them representing the eastern "counties"voivodships of the Commonwealth (from the Grand Duchy of Lithuania). The first head of the KEN was Prince Bishop Michał Jerzy Poniatowski. Although the other members were mostly magnate politicians, the main founders of the body were the prominent writers and scientists of the epoch: Franciszek Bieliński, Julian Ursyn Niemcewicz, Feliks Oraczewski, Andrzej Gawroński, Dawid Pilchowski, Hieronim Stroynowski and Grzegorz Piramowicz. They were joined by Pierre Samuel du Pont de Nemours, the Secretary of the King of Poland (and father of the founder of the DuPont company).

Despite the fact that, initially, the KEN had to face a strong opposition in the Sejm, it was supported by both the monarch and the Familia party, which accorded it almost complete independence in management of its affairs.

Early (formative) period (1773–1780)

In 1773 the KEN was granted much of the former property of the Jesuit order, including all the schools, and many palaces and Church-owned villages. Due to this fact, the Commission had not only  benefited from the necessary infrastructure, but also had its own profit-yielding farms.

The Commission supervised two universities (the Jagiellonian University in Kraków and the Vilnius University in Vilnius), 74 secondary schools and about 1600 parish schools. The third Commonwealth's university, the Lwów University, had been lost to the Austrian Partition.

Soon afterwards Hugo Kołłątaj prepared a three-level-based education plan:
 Parochial schools – for peasants and burghers;
 Powiat schools – mostly for children of the szlachta (nobility); however, children of lower classes were also admitted;
 Universities – Academy of Warsaw, Academy of Vilnius and Academy of Kraków

Since all prior education in the Polish–Lithuanian Commonwealth was conducted mostly in Latin, the KEN faced the problem of an almost complete lack of books and manuals. To cope with the problem the Society of Elementary Books (Towarzystwo Ksiąg Elementarnych) was, therefore, established. The Society sponsored competitions for creating the best textbooks. The scientists—working on the new Polish language textbooks—had, at times, to come up with the necessary vocabulary entries. Much of the vocabulary they invented (in relation to Chemistry, Physics, Mathematics or Grammar) is still in use up to this day.

The Commission also devised several documents, outlining the whole educational process. However, several of the new principles were considered too novel for that age, and were often ignored. These included, inter alia, the principle of 'equality of both sexes' in education. 
In 1780, the Opposition refused to sign the Statute on Elementary Schools (which was drafted by Kołłątaj).

In 1774 the Commission took over the Załuski Library.

Second phase (1781–1788)
After the formative period, during which the prerogatives of the Commission were established, the KEN started to convert schools to the new model. The three universities in Warsaw, Vilnius and Kraków were granted the right of curatorship over schools of lower degree. This included the schools which remained under the influence of the Roman Church. Gradually, the teachers, who were frequently former Jesuit priests, were exchanged for young lay teachers - graduates of the three academies. Thanks to this move, the opposition inside the local schools was finally broken.

Third phase (1788–1794)

After 1789 the supporters of reforms in the Polish Sejm gradually started to lose their influence. Similarly, the KEN was deprived of many of its former privileges. During the Sejm Wielki the Reformers had to sacrifice many of those privileges in order to gain support for the strongly reformist Constitution of May the 3rd which aimed to strengthen the country against further partition in 1791. Ultimately, after the victory of the Confederation of Targowica, in 1794, the KEN lost control over most of the schools in the Commonwealth and many of its members were banished or had to defect abroad. This included Hugo Kołłątaj himself, who had to escape to Dresden. The process of dissolving the Commonwealth was completed in 1795, with its territory being ceded to Russia, Prussia and Austria.

Legacy

Although the Commission had only functioned for around 20 years, it managed to completely change the shape of education in Poland. The Enlightenment-based school programmes and books influenced the whole generation of Poles. Also, although education was still far from being universal, it became accessible to a much wider group of people, including peasants. Thousands of teachers—trained in lay teachers' seminaries—became the backbone of Polish science during the Partitions and the generation, educated in the schools created and supervised by the KEN, gave rise to the most prominent personalities of the Polish Uprisings and of politics in Central Europe in the 19th century. In addition, the 27 elementary textbooks and manuals, published by the Commission, laid the foundations for the Polish language terminology in Chemistry, Physics, Logics, Grammar and Mathematics. They were used by all prominent Polish scientists and authors of the 19th century, from Adam Mickiewicz to Bolesław Prus and from the Lwów School of Mathematics to the Lwów–Warsaw School of History. The Guidebook to Chemistry, by Jędrzej Śniadecki, remained in use in the Polish schools well beyond the 1930s.

It is often argued, with quite some force, that because of the efforts of the Commission of National Education, the Polish language and culture did not disappear into oblivion, during the Partitions of Poland – heavy Russification and Germanisation notwithstanding.

Members 

Members of Commission of National Education were:

Notes

Further reading
 Gorecki, Danuta M. "The Commission of National Education and Civic Revival through Books in Eighteenth-Century Poland." Journal of Library History 15.2 (1980): 138-166.

External links
 KEN in Polish State Archives
 Polish Ministry of Education

1773 establishments in the Polish–Lithuanian Commonwealth
1794 disestablishments
Education ministries
History of education in Poland
Science and technology in Poland
History of education in Lithuania